The West Valley Fire was a wildfire in Dixie National Forest, approximately ten miles north of St. George, Utah in the United States. The fire was started by an abandoned campfire and was first reported on June 27 and reported contained by August 7.

Events

June
The West Valley Fire was reported on June 27 at approximately 3:00 PM burning in the Dixie National Forest, 10 miles north of St. George, Utah. The fire was started by an abandoned campfire. By June 29, the fire had grown , burning into the Mill Flat Fire scar from 2006, slowing the fire's progression north-northeast. Dixie National Forest was temporarily closed in select areas.

July

Red flag warnings caused an increase in fire activity at the beginning of July. Additional areas of the national forest were closed along the West Valley Fire perimeter and in the Pine Valley Ranger District. On July 11, Burned Area Emergency Response began investigation regarding post-fire rehabilitation.

August
The fire was reported contained by August 7.

References

External links
 

2018 Utah wildfires
Dixie National Forest
June 2018 events in the United States
July 2018 events in the United States